Charles Istaz (August 3, 1924 – July 28, 2007) was a Belgian-born German-American professional wrestler and trainer, best known by his ring name Karl Gotch. In Japan, Gotch was known as the "God of Wrestling" due to his influence in shaping the Japanese professional wrestling style. He has no relation to the earlier wrestler Frank Gotch.

Early life 

Istaz was born in Antwerp, Belgium to a Hungarian father and German mother. He grew up in Antwerp, on the waterfront. He learned Greco-Roman wrestling in his early years and from the beginning he was a very well known sportsman. He wrestled in "The Hippodroom", a notable sports center in Antwerp, where amateur fights like boxing matches, savate matches and wrestling matches were fought.

During World War II,  Istaz was a forced laborer in the "REIMAHG" at Kahla. (Lager E - Kahla)

Amateur wrestling career 
Istaz excelled in amateur wrestling and experienced a major breakthrough in his career by competing as Charles Istaz for Belgium in the 1948 Olympics in both freestyle and Greco-Roman wrestling. Gotch also trained in the Indian martial art of Pehlwani. This training led to Istaz's regime of calisthenic bodyweight exercise, which were used by Indian wrestlers and other athletes to build leg endurance and strength. He also adopted other Indian exercises, such as the bridge, Hindu squats, and Hindu press ups in his wrestling. Gotch's philosophy was later passed on to several of his students.

Professional wrestling career

Europe and the United States 
Istaz's professional wrestling career began after training in the "Snake Pit", run by the renowned catch wrestler Billy Riley. He debuted in the 1950, wrestling throughout Europe under the ring name Karl Krauser, and winning various titles including the German Heavyweight Championship and the European Championship.

In the late 1950s, Istaz moved to the United States, and began wrestling as Karl Gotch. In the United States, Gotch's wrestling style and lack of showmanship held him back, and he did not experience any great popularity at the time. In 1961, he won the American Wrestling Alliance (Ohio) World Heavyweight Championship. Gotch held the belt for two years before dropping the title to Lou Thesz, one of the few American wrestlers he respected because of the similarities of their styles (the two also share a common German/Hungarian heritage). In 1962, Gotch was involved in a backstage altercation with the then-NWA World Heavyweight Champion "Nature Boy" Buddy Rogers, in which Rogers was injured. The incident alienated Gotch from American promoters, and he began looking for work in Japan.

He returned to the United States for a stint in the 1970s, with a brief run in the World Wide Wrestling Federation from August 1971 to February 1972. On December 6, 1971, he teamed with Rene Goulet to win the WWWF World Tag Team Championship from the inaugural champions, Luke Graham and Tarzan Tyler, in two straight falls of a best-two-out-of-three-falls match in Madison Square Garden. They lost the championship on February 1, 1972, to Baron Mikel Scicluna and King Curtis.

Japan 
During the 1960s, Gotch began wrestling in other countries. He wrestled in Australia as Karl Krauser, and in 1965 he defeated Spiros Arion to win the International Wrestling Alliance's Heavyweight Championship. He had also begun working in Japan, where he became very popular due to his amateur wrestling style. He wrestled in the main event of the very first show held by New Japan Pro-Wrestling (NJPW) on March 6, 1972, defeating Antonio Inoki. His final match occurred on January 1, 1982, when he pinned Yoshiaki Fujiwara with the German Suplex. Throughout the 1970s and 1980s, Gotch worked as both the booker and trainer for NJPW. He trained several wrestlers in Japan, including Hideki Suzuki, Hiro Matsuda, Satoru Sayama, Osamu Kido, Barry Darsow, Minoru Suzuki, Tatsumi Fujinami, Akira Maeda and Yoshiaki Fujiwara.

Personal life 
Istaz was married and had a daughter. They resided in Florida.

Legacy and death 
Gotch became known as a "God" (神様 Kami-sama) in Japan. Gotch's wrestling style, alongside fellow hooker Lou Thesz, had a big impact on Inoki, who adopted and popularized his submission-based style. Some of Istaz's trainees founded the Universal Wrestling Federation in Japan in 1984, which showcased the shoot-style of professional wrestling. The success of UWF and similar promotions influenced Japanese wrestling in subsequent decades, and changed the style of matches in NJPW and All Japan Pro Wrestling.

Gotch was friends and training partners with judo exponents Masahiko Kimura and Kiyotaka Otsubo, who also had tenures as professional wrestlers. Gotch was vocal in his opposition to the growing sport of Brazilian jiu-jitsu, decrying its practitioners as "old whores waiting for a consumer" due to their defensive usage of the guard position.

The German suplex is named after Gotch. Gotch was inducted into the Wrestling Observer Hall of Fame as part of the inaugural class in 1996. In 2007, he was inducted into the Professional Wrestling Hall of Fame. He Innovated the Cradle Piledriver and the Kneeling Belly-to Belly Piledriver.

Istaz died on July 28, 2007 in Tampa, Florida at the age of 82.

His ashes were mostly spread in Lake Keystone, Florida. However, in 2017, ten years after his death, some of his ashes were interned at a grave in Ekoin Temple in Arakawa, Tokyo.

Championships and accomplishments 
American Wrestling Alliance (Ohio)
AWA World Heavyweight Championship (1 time)
George Tragos/Lou Thesz Professional Wrestling Hall of Fame
 Class of 2009
International Professional Wrestling Hall of Fame
Class of 2022
New Japan Pro-Wrestling
Real World Championship (2 times)
Greatest 18 Club inductee
Professional Wrestling Hall of Fame and Museum
Class of 2007
Tokyo Sports
Service Award (2007)
World Championship Wrestling (Australia)
IWA World Heavyweight Championship (1 time)
World Wide Wrestling Federation
WWWF World Tag Team Championship (1 time) – with Rene Goulet
Worldwide Wrestling Associates
WWA World Tag Team Championship (2 times) – with Mike DiBiase
Wrestling Observer Newsletter
Wrestling Observer Newsletter Hall of Fame (Class of 1996)

Footnotes

References

External links 
 Website of the film 'Catch – the hold not taken', a documentary featuring Gotch on the history of Catch wrestling and Riley's gym, where Gotch trained
 An Interview with Karl Gotch (Karl has stated that he was egregiously misquoted in this interview and his responses were changed when he spoke outside of "kayfabe".)
 Overview of Shootfighting and Karl Gotch with large gallery of Gotch and Catch Wrestling photos
 

1924 births
2007 deaths
Sportspeople from Antwerp
Olympic wrestlers of Belgium
Wrestlers at the 1948 Summer Olympics
Belgian catch wrestlers
Belgian professional wrestlers
German male professional wrestlers
Professional Wrestling Hall of Fame and Museum
Professional wrestling trainers
Jewish professional wrestlers
Stampede Wrestling alumni
Expatriate professional wrestlers in Japan
Belgian Jews
Belgian people of Hungarian descent
Belgian emigrants to Germany
German emigrants to the United States
Sportspeople from Hamburg
Belgian expatriate sportspeople in Japan
20th-century professional wrestlers
NWA Americas Tag Team Champions
IWA World Heavyweight Champions (Australia)